NPV Oryx (P01) is a patrol vessel of the Namibian Navy. Formerly a civilian fisheries patrol vessel it was transferred to the Ministry of Defence in 2002, it was commissioned in 2002 into the Namibian Navy.

Operational history
The vessel was donated by the Namibian Ministry of Fisheries (NMF) to the Navy in 2002 making it the first ship of the Namibian  Navy in service joining two smaller Namacurra boat donated by the South African Navy. The first Commanding Officer of the vessel was Commander Sinsy Nghipandua.The vessel is utilised by the Namibian Navy for general Exclusive Economic Zone management.

References

Ships of the Namibian Navy